1978 ACC tournament may refer to:

 1978 ACC men's basketball tournament
 1978 ACC women's basketball tournament
 1978 Atlantic Coast Conference baseball tournament